The 2020 Tarleton State Texans football team represented Tarleton State University as an independent the 2020–21 NCAA Division I FCS football season. The team had planned to play in the fall 2020, until the postponement of the season on August 10, 2020 because of the COVID-19 pandemic. A schedule for the spring of 2021 was later arranged. Led by 11th-year head coach Todd Whitten, the Texas compiled a record of 5–3. Tarleton State played their home games at Memorial Stadium in Stephenville, Texas.

Previous season
The Texans finished the 2019 season 11–1 overall and won the Lone Star Conference title with an 8–0 mark in conference play. They qualified for the NCAA Division II playoffs, but lost in the first round to Texas A&M–Commerce.

Schedule
The team's 2020 fall schedule was scheduled with six home and six away games. On August 10, 2020, Tarleton State University announced the postponement of the football season, due to the COVID-19 pandemic, until the spring of 2021.

References

Tarleton State
Tarleton State Texans football seasons
Tarleton State Texans football